United States gubernatorial elections were held in 1908, in 33 states, concurrent with the House, Senate elections and presidential election, on November 3, 1908 (except in Arkansas, Georgia, Maine and Vermont, which held early elections).

In Ohio, the gubernatorial election was held in an even-numbered year for the first time, having previously been held in odd-numbered years with the previous election taking place in 1905.

Results

See also 
1908 United States elections
1908 United States presidential election
1908–09 United States Senate elections
1908 United States House of Representatives elections

References

Notes 

 
November 1908 events